Jazz for the Thinker is the debut album by multi-instrumentalist Yusef Lateef recorded in 1957 and released on the Savoy label. The album was produced from Lateef's earliest recording session and was the second album released under his leadership.

Reception

The Allmusic site awarded the album 3 stars.

Track listing 
All compositions by Yusef Lateef
 "Happyology" - 10:50   
 "O' Blues" - 9:00   
 "Midday" - 7:46   
 "Polarity" - 6:58   
 "Space" - 5:48

Personnel 
Yusef Lateef - tenor saxophone, flute, arghul, scraper, vocalizing
Curtis Fuller - trombone, tambourine
Hugh Lawson - piano
Ernie Farrow - bass, rabat
Louis Hayes - drums
Doug Watkins - finger cymbals, percussion

References 

Yusef Lateef albums
1957 debut albums
Albums produced by Ozzie Cadena
Savoy Records albums